Ladislav Ščurko (born 4 April 1986) is a Slovak professional ice hockey center who currently playing for HC 21 Prešov in Slovak Extraliga. 

He previously played for HC Košice until he confessed to a murder of an ice hockey referee in April 2009.

Playing career
Ščurko started his junior career by playing in 37 games with his junior team, HK VTJ Spisská Nová Ves, in Slovakia. He scored 44 points on 20 goals and 24 assists. Following that season he was drafted by the Philadelphia Flyers in the sixth round, 170th overall, in the 2004 NHL Entry Draft. Shortly after, he was drafted seventh overall in the CHL Import Draft by the Seattle Thunderbirds. In his first year in the Western Hockey League (WHL), he scored 42 points, which put him in fifth in the league for points scored by a rookie. He also set a Thunderbird record with a nine-game point streak from December 11, 2004 through January 12, 2005, during which he scored 12 points. He enjoyed similar success in fewer games the following season.

Murder

On April 23, 2009, Ščurko confessed to a murder of referee Marek Liptaj in January 2008 at a motorway service area near Kosice. He admitted that he killed Liptaj by stabbing him fourteen times with a knife. Liptaj's body was hastily buried in a forest. No motive was revealed, but police said the crime was not premeditated.

On July 16, 2012, Ščurko was convicted of the murder; however, because psychiatric examinations found that Ščurko committed the act in a state of diminished sanity, the court sentenced him to the minimum penalty of eight years in prison.

First imprisonment
He served his first sentence from April 2009 to November 2011.

Life after the first release
Ščurko was released from jail on November 8, 2011 and played his first hockey game after the release from prison on December 3, 2011. He played for his boyhood club HK Slovan Gelnica.

Second imprisonment
Ščurko served the rest of his sentence from September 2014 to December 2015 and was finally conditionally released before Christmas in 2015.

Playing career after the second release
He signed a contract with HC 46 Bardejov, which plays in the second-level ice hockey league in Slovakia, only one week after the release from prison. He played his first game for HC 46 Bardejov on December 22, 2015.

Since the 2017-2018 season, Ščurko has been playing in Slovak Extraliga for HC 07 Detva.

Career statistics

Regular season and playoffs

International

Awards and honors

Records
Seattle Thunderbirds' franchise record for longest point streak: 9 games (12 points, from 11 December 2004 to 12 January 2005)

References

External links

1986 births
Living people
People from Gelnica
Sportspeople from the Košice Region
Slovak ice hockey centres
Slovak people convicted of murder
Slovak prisoners and detainees
Philadelphia Flyers draft picks
HK Spišská Nová Ves players
Seattle Thunderbirds players
Tri-City Americans players
HC Košice players
HK Dukla Michalovce players
HC 07 Detva players
HC 21 Prešov players
Slovak expatriate ice hockey players in the United States
Sportspeople convicted of murder